The Yahoo! Consumer group is a group included in Yahoo!’s reorganization under CEO Scott Thompson. It includes three units: Media, Connections, and Commerce.

Media unit
Led by Ross Levinsohn, the Media unit includes the Yahoo! Homepage, Yahoo! News, Yahoo! Finance, Yahoo! Sports, and Yahoo! Entertainment. Technology, — Such as the Yahoo! Publishing Platform (YPP), will be brought into close partnership with content producers and editors. This unit will continue to drive original coverage of both breaking news events, and other events such as the Royal Wedding, and the upcoming Olympics and US Elections.

Connections
Led by Shashi Seth, the Yahoo! Consumer Group includes consumer businesses that connect and inform users, which include Yahoo! Search, Yahoo! Communications, as well as properties such as Yahoo! Mail, Yahoo! Messenger, Flickr, Yahoo! Answers, and more.

Commerce
It is expected that this newly created team will play a critical role in Yahoo!'s future growth and will go beyond traditional e-commerce. The focus of this team will be driving higher ROI for advertisers and agencies. The foundation of the new Commerce group will be Yahoo! Autos, Yahoo! Shopping, Yahoo! Travel, Yahoo! Jobs, Yahoo! Personals and Yahoo! Real Estate.

On April 16, 2012, Bloomberg reported that Sam Shrauger will co-lead the new consumer-commerce division with Mollie Spilman.

References 

Consumer group